Fairview Drive may refer to:

 Fairview Drive, Fayetteville, Arkansas, the location of Hantz House
 Fairview Drive, McGehee, Arkansas, the location of Jay Lewis House
 Fairview Drive, a road in Hancock, West Virginia
 Fairview Drive in Nevada, a junction of Interstate 580

See also 
 Fairview (disambiguation)
 Fairview Road (disambiguation)